Klen is a former settlement in the Municipality of Moravče in central Slovenia. It is now part of the village of Češnjice pri Moravčah. The area is part of the traditional region of Upper Carniola. The municipality is now included in the Central Slovenia Statistical Region.

Geography
Klen lies in the western part of Češnjice pri Moravčah, southwest of the main settlement.

History
Klen had a population of four living in one house in 1900. Klen was annexed by Češnjice pri Moravčah in 1952, ending its existence as an independent settlement.

References

External links

Klen on Geopedia

Populated places in the Municipality of Moravče
Former settlements in Slovenia